The 2019 WWE Hall of Fame was a professional wrestling event produced by WWE that featured the introduction of the twentieth class into the WWE Hall of Fame. It took place on April 6, 2019 from the Barclays Center in Brooklyn, New York, as part of WrestleMania 35 weekend. The event aired live on the WWE Network.

Background
On February 18, 2019, WWE announced their first inductees to the 2019 Hall of Fame class, D-Generation X. Although other members have been part of the group, only Triple H, Shawn Michaels, Chyna, Road Dogg, Billy Gunn and X-Pac will be included as part of the induction. D-Generation X originally had been planned to be inducted into the 2013 Hall of Fame class, but plans were scrapped after Bruno Sammartino agreed to be inducted. With D-Generation X's induction, Michaels will join Ric Flair as a two-time inductee, having been inducted individually in 2011. Following Chyna's death in 2016, many industry stalwarts, such as Stone Cold Steve Austin and Mick Foley, spoke out in favor of Chyna being included in the Hall of Fame, but she had been repeatedly excluded until 2019 due to her venture into pornography following the end of her professional wrestling career.

On February 26, 2019, The Honky Tonk Man was announced as the first individual inductee for the 2019 Hall of Fame ceremony. On April 5, 2019, it was announced that former Money Inc. manager Jimmy Hart would induct The Honky Tonk Man.

On March 3, 2019, Torrie Wilson was announced as the first female individual inductee for the 2019 Hall of Fame ceremony. She was inducted by fellow former women's wrestler Stacy Keibler.

On March 11, 2019, Harlem Heat (Booker T and Stevie Ray) were announced. With Harlem Heat's induction, Booker T will join Michaels and Flair as a two-time inductee, having been inducted individually in 2013. Prior to Booker T asking Stevie Ray to induct him, the two had not talked in five years.

On March 18, 2019, it was announced that WWE's Senior Director of Talent Relations Sue Aitchison would be the recipient of the 2019 Warrior Award. Aitchison is credited with WWE's relationship with the Make-A-Wish Foundation and WrestleMania Reading Challenge program.

On March 25, 2019, it was announced that the original Hart Foundation (Bret Hart and Jim Neidhart) would be inducted into the Hall of Fame. With the Hart Foundation's induction, Hart joined Booker T, Michaels and Flair as a two-time inductee, having been individually inducted in 2006.

Brutus "The Barber" Beefcake was announced as the final individual inductee for the 2019 Hall of Fame ceremony. On April 4, 2019, it was announced that he would be inducted by Mega-Maniacs teammate Hulk Hogan (Hogan's third time as inductor, having previously inducted "Mean" Gene Okerlund in 2006 and "Macho Man" Randy Savage in 2015).

Inductees

Individual

Group
 Class headliners appear in boldface

Warrior Award

Legacy

Incidents

Assault on Bret Hart
During the induction of The Hart Foundation, as Bret Hart and Natalya delivered their speech, a man trespassed into the ring and tackled Hart. The live broadcast on the WWE Network suddenly blacked out when the attack happened and then the broadcast returned live with cameras panned to the crowd. In the immediate aftermath, several wrestlers including his nephew Davey Boy Smith Jr., Dash Wilder, Scott Dawson, Braun Strowman, Heath Slater, Drew McIntyre, Big Show, Shane McMahon, Big E, and Drake Maverick, as well as MMA fighter Travis Browne subdued the man. Hart and Natalya resumed their speech. The man was arrested. The incident was removed from repeat airings of the ceremony on the WWE Network.

The man was taken into police custody and faced criminal charges, of which were not disclosed as the official was not authorized to discuss the case and spoke on the condition of anonymity. He was charged with two counts of third degree assault, one count of criminal trespass, and one violation of local law of disorderly conduct the next day. WWE issued a statement on the incident, reading: "An over-exuberant fan surpassed our security at ringside and made his way briefly into the ring. The individual has been turned over to the proper authorities." Dave Meltzer from Wrestling Observer Newsletter reported that Hart visited the hospital on Saturday night following the attack, suffering some discomfort with his hip replacement from the fall. Despite this, Hart made an appearance, during the entrance of Natalya and Beth Phoenix, the next day at WrestleMania 35.

Resignation of Robert Evans
Reportedly, WWE writers were asked not to mention WWE chairman and CEO Vince McMahon when helping to write speeches for Hall of Fame inductees. As a result, after Bret Hart thanked McMahon during The Hart Foundation's induction, Robert Evans, who was responsible for writing the line in the speech, got into a dispute with McMahon, and Evans ultimately quit the company.

References

WWE Hall of Fame ceremonies
Professional wrestling in New York City
2019 in professional wrestling
April 2019 events in the United States
Events in Brooklyn, New York
2019 in sports in New York City